Phaeosia is a monotypic moth genus in the subfamily Arctiinae erected by George Hampson in 1900. Its only species, Phaeosia lutea, was described by Herbert Druce in 1885. It is found in Guatemala and Mexico.

Subspecies
Phaeosia lutea lutea
Phaeosia lutea intermedia (Druce, 1885) (Mexico)

Former species
 Phaeosia dimorpha Hampson, 1918
 Phaeosia orientalis Hampson, 1905

References

Lithosiini
Moths described in 1885
Monotypic moth genera